Ambika may refer to:

Mythology 
 Ambika (goddess), an avatar of the Hindu goddesses Durga, Parvati, and Shakti
 Ambika (Jainism), a Jain Yakshini goddess
 Ambika (Mahabharata), the wife of Vichitravirya was also the mother of Dhritarashtra, the father of the Kuaravas

Other uses 
 Ambika (given name), an Indian given name (including a list of persons with the name)
 Ambika (actress) (born 1962), Indian actress in Malayalam, Tamil, Kannada, and Telugu films
 Ambika-class replenishment ship, a class of vessel in the Indian Navy
 Ambika River, a river in Gujarat, India
 Any of several entities (e.g. Ambika Paul Foundation, Ambika P3, Ambika House) connected to Swraj Paul, Baron Paul
 Ambika, the Sanskrit name of the plant Wrightia antidysenterica